Grigoriora is a genus of Asian bush crickets belonging to the tribe Meconematini: in the subfamily Meconematinae.

Species 
The Orthoptera Species File lists the following species, found in Indo-China and China:
 Grigoriora alia Gorochov, 1998
 Grigoriora beybienkoi Gorochov, 1998
 Grigoriora breviuscula Gorochov, 1998
 Grigoriora cheni (Bey-Bienko, 1955)
 Grigoriora cryptocerca Liu, 2020
 Grigoriora dicata Gorochov, 1993 – type species (locality Gia Lai Province, Vietnam)
 Grigoriora kweichowensis (Tinkham, 1944)
 Grigoriora segregata Gorochov, 1998
 Grigoriora spinosa Gorochov, 1998
 Grigoriora tassirii (Sänger & Helfert, 1996)

References 

Tettigoniidae genera
Meconematinae
Orthoptera of Asia